Washington Valley is an unincorporated community in the Whippany River valley within Morris Township in Morris County, New Jersey.

History

Munsee Lenape ownership 
Circa 1000, the land was inhabited by the Munsee Lenape. Circa 1500, Morris County was part of the Lenapehoking.

Arrowheads found in Munsee encampments throughout the Washington Valley suggest that they hunted wolf, elk, and wild turkey for game. They likely ate mussels from the Whippany river.

In the 17th century, Munsee Lenape fishermen made an annual pilgrimage from the Washington Valley to the Minisink Island on the Delaware river, in part to procure shellfish. Local farmer and philanthropist Caroline Foster has said it is likely that Munsee farmers cultivated corn in the summertime in the fields of the Washington Valley.

Forced relocation 

In 1757, the New Jersey Society for Helping Indians expelled Munsee Lenape from their native land.

Led by Reverend John Brainerd, colonists forcefully relocated 200 people to a land reservation named Brotherton in Burlington County, an industrial town known for gristmills and sawmills. It was later known as Indian Mills. This was the first Native American reservation in New Jersey.

The Munsee Lenape's community leaders wrote multiple treaties, including a 1780 treaty to denounce selling any more land to white settlers. In 1796, the Oneidas of New Stockbridge invited the Munsee Lenape to join their reservation. A 1798 treaty announced their refusal to leave "our fine place in Jersey."

However, in 1801, many of the Munsee Lenape families agreed to move to New Stockbridge, New York to join the Oneidas, except for some families that stayed behind.

In 1822, the remaining families were moved again by white colonists, over 900 miles' travel away, to Green Bay, Wisconsin.

Colonial ownership 
In 1757, English colonists established Washington Valley Road.

American ownership 
In the 18th century, Washington Valley became a suburb of the city of Morristown; residents would travel into town for church services and to sell farm products. A schoolhouse is the only non-residential historic building in Washington Valley, displaying its lack of significant local commerce and industry. The legacy of its connection to Morristown continues today.

In 1806, the Washington Turnpike was built as an improvement to an 18th century road. Today the turnpike is referred to as Mendham Road and New Jersey Route 24.

In 1852, the district was first referred to as Washington Valley by school superintendents, who created the Washington Valley School District.

Circa 1960, the Morris County Municipal Utilities Authority purchased land along the Whippany River in an effort to construct a reservoir. In 1960, as a response, local residents including Barbara Hoskins and Caroline Foster of Fosterfields wrote and published Washington Valley: An Informal History to prevent reservoir development in Washington Valley. The effort was successful as the Morris County Municipal Utilities Authority turned over its acreage to the Morris County Park Commission.

Historic properties
There are several historic properties in the encompassing Washington Valley Historic District, which was added to the National Register of Historic Places on November 12, 1992 for its significance in agriculture, architecture, education, transportation, and community planning. The district includes 117 contributing buildings, 17 contributing structures, one contributing object and one contributing site.

The Washington Valley Schoolhouse, a one-room schoolhouse built in 1869 and located at the intersection of Washington Valley Road and Schoolhouse Lane, was added to the NRHP on October 15, 1973.

The John Smith House, built in 1812 and located at 124 Washington Valley Road, was added to the NRHP on January 1, 1976.

References

External links
 

Morris Township, New Jersey
Unincorporated communities in Morris County, New Jersey
Unincorporated communities in New Jersey